Josephstaal Rural LLG is a local-level government (LLG) of Madang Province, Papua New Guinea.

Wards
01. Ingawaia
02. Bogen
03. Osum
04. Avunmakai
05. Evuar
06. Mandugar
07. Arimbugor
08. Kisila / Simbar
09. Iabaranga
10. Kangarangat
11. Yamamuk
12. Inasi
13. Amjaivuvu
14. Angasa
15. Kaibugu
16. Ivarai
17. Kinbugor
18. Aragnam
19. Ambok
20. Kamambu
21. Sangur Sangur
22. Munimatamam
23. Atitau
24. Arimatau
25. Abasakul
26. Kokomasak

See also
Josephstaal languages

References

Local-level governments of Madang Province